No Place Like Jail is a 1918 American silent comedy film directed by Frank Terry  that features Stan Laurel.

Cast
 Dan Alberts	
 Margaret Hansen
 Estelle Harrison
 Wallace Howe
 Bud Jamison
 Stan Laurel
 Gus Leonard
 Chris Lynton
 Belle Mitchell
 Herb Morris
 Marie Mosquini
 James Parrott
 William Petterson
 Hazel Powell
 Alice Renze
 Jane Sherman
 Dorothy Terry
 Dorothea Wolbert
 Noah Young

See also
 List of American films of 1918

References

External links

1918 films
1918 short films
American silent short films
American black-and-white films
1918 comedy films
Silent American comedy films
American comedy short films
1910s American films